Bobbin Records was an American, St. Louis-based independent record label, founded by blues musician Little Milton and KATZ-AM disc jockey Bob Lyons in 1958. The label was instrumental in exposing Milton and other local artist to wider audiences. As the head of A&R, Milton recruited Albert King, Oliver Sain, and Fontella Bass to record for Bobbin. Bobbin was eventually distributed by the Chess Records.

The Bobbin catalog consists of 44 records between 1958 and 1963. The first release on the label was Milton's "I'm A Lonely Man" in 1958 which sold 60,000 copies. Altogether Milton released seven singles on the label, including two that were released after Leonard Chess bout out Lyons and signed Milton and other artists on Bobbin to his Checker Records label.

In October 1961, Bobbin released Albert King's "Don't Throw Your Love on Me So Strong" which featured musician Ike Turner on piano. The single did well enough locally that King Records leased the recording from Bobbin and released it as a single the next month. It became King's first hit, peaking No.14 on the Billboard R&B chart.

In 1996, Ace Records released the compilation CD St. Louis Blues Revue: The Classic Bobbin Sessions.

Partial discography

References 

American record labels
Rhythm and blues record labels
Pop record labels
Rock and roll record labels
Record labels established in 1958
Vanity record labels
Music of St. Louis
Blues record labels
Defunct record labels of the United States
1958 establishments in Missouri